Raghuleela Mega Mall is a mall in Kandivali, a suburb of Mumbai. Developed by Raghuleela Properties Pvt. Raghuleela Mega Mall is one of the most popular malls strategically located between Borivali & Kandivali in Mumbai. The mall was developed by the Vijay Associates (Wadhwa). The mall is centrally air-conditioned and includes twelve imported escalators and two capsule lifts.

The mall has an INOX multiplex theatre on the second floor which has four auditoriums including 3D silver screens that can accommodate 1275 seats in all.

Numismatic Showroom - Coins & Currency Shop  

' SNS Coins Investment Gallery is on the 2nd floor.
Gp 8A - 2nd Floor Raghuleelaa Mega Mall Kandivali west Mumbai India 

Dealing in Old Coins & Currency

Attached play park
The mall's  play park, Jungle Kingdom, is on the third floor. There is also a bowling alley, video game section, and Dashing Cars Joint.

See also
 Raghuleela Mall, Vashi

References

Shopping malls in Mumbai
Shopping malls established in 2009
2009 establishments in Maharashtra